The discography of Japanese rock band Abingdon Boys School includes two studio albums, eight singles, one live album, four video albums, one compilation album, eight soundtrack appearances, and seven other appearances in releases not under that name. Abingdon Boys School (stylized as "abingdon boys school" or abbreviated "a.b.s"), was formed in 2005 by Takanori Nishikawa, or T.M.Revolution, who originally named the band ABS after Ebisu, Tokyo, Japan, and later changed the band's name to Abingdon Boys School, a school formerly attended by members of Radiohead. The band plays alternative rock and is currently signed to Epic Records Japan.

Abingdon Boys School has contributed to the soundtracks of numerous anime and video game series and several tribute albums. Their music has been used as opening or closing tracks for anime series, including Darker than Black, Soul Eater, and Tokyo Magnitude 8.0, and games, including Sengoku Basara. In addition, they have also contributed to tribute albums to the manga Nana and the rock bands Luna Sea and Buck-Tick. They also perform in a live DVD by Buck-Tick.

Both of the band's studio albums reached number two on the Oricon charts. Abingdon Boys School's singles have all charted on the Oricon charts as well; the singles "Blade Chord" and "From Dusk Till Dawn" have peaked at number two and number three respectively. Additionally, the band's four videos have all charted, with Abingdon Boys School Japan Tour 2008 and Abingdon Road Movies both peaking at number ten. Two of the band's releases, the album Abingdon Boys School and the single "Innocent Sorrow", have been certified gold by the Recording Industry Association of Japan.

Albums

Studio albums

Compilation albums

Live albums

Video albums

Singles

Soundtracks

Other appearances

Footnotes

Notes

References

External links
Abingdon Boys School's homepage

Discographies of Japanese artists
Rock music group discographies